Movileni is a commune in Olt County, Muntenia, Romania. It is composed of two villages, Bacea and Movileni.

Natives
Emanoil Ionescu (1887–1949), a General during World War II and commander of the Royal Romanian Air Force's Corpul I Aerian.

References
Citations

Bibliography

Communes in Olt County
Localities in Muntenia